Phosphorescent is the stage name of American singer-songwriter Matthew Houck. Originally from Huntsville, Alabama, Houck began recording and performing under this nickname in 2001 in Athens, Georgia.  He is currently based in Nashville, Tennessee.

Overview
Before recording under the name Phosphorescent, Matthew Houck traveled the world playing under the name Fillup Shack and self-released a limited pressing of the album Hipolit in 2000. Houck later changed his recording name to Phosphorescent and released the full-length LP A Hundred Times or More in 2003. The album was released through Athens, Georgia-based independent label Warm Records. The following year, he released the EP The Weight of Flight. Phosphorescent rose to wider critical acclaim after releasing Aw Come Aw Wry in August 2005 and Pride in October 2007. The latter was named the 12th best album of 2007 by Stylus Magazine and received an 8.0 rating from the online indie magazine Pitchfork. In 2009, inspired by Willie Nelson's tribute album to Lefty Frizzell To Lefty from Willie, Houck crafted a tribute album to Nelson himself entitled To Willie, which was released through Dead Oceans. Phosphorescent released Here's to Taking It Easy in 2010.

Muchacho, Phosphorescent's sixth studio album, was released in 2013 to critical acclaim. The full studio album C'est La Vie followed in 2018.

Discography

Studio albums

Singles and other releases

Compilation appearances

References

External links

 
 Ukulele Session by Noahm for Le Soir
 Phosphorescent, A Full-Grown Man

1980 births
American indie rock musicians
Living people
Musicians from Athens, Georgia
Dead Oceans artists
Misra Records artists
Warm Electronic Recordings artists